The 1940 Masters Tournament was the seventh Masters Tournament, held April 4–7 at Augusta National Golf Club in Augusta, Georgia.

Jimmy Demaret won the first of his three Masters titles, four strokes ahead of runner-up Lloyd Mangrum, the largest margin of victory until 1948. The purse was $5,000 and the winner's share was $1,500.

Mangrum shot an opening round 64 (−8), a new course record by two strokes, and it stood for 46 years, until Nick Price's 63 in 1986, later equaled by Greg Norman in 1996. Although all three of these players won major titles, none won a Masters.

Field
1. Masters champions
Ralph Guldahl (2,9,10), Byron Nelson (2,9,10,12), Henry Picard (6,9,10,12), Gene Sarazen (2,4,6,9), Horton Smith (9,10,12)

2. U.S. Open champions
Tommy Armour (4,6,9,10), Billy Burke (9), Chick Evans (3,a), Johnny Farrell, Walter Hagen (4,6), Bobby Jones (3,4,5), Tony Manero (9), George Sargent

3. U.S. Amateur champions
Lawson Little (5,9)

4. British Open champions

5. British Amateur champions
Charlie Yates (8,9,a)

6. PGA champions
Johnny Revolta (10), Paul Runyan (9,10,12)

7. Members of the U.S. Ryder Cup team
Not held

8. Members of the U.S. 1938 Walker Cup team
Ray Billows (11,a), Chuck Kocsis (a), Tommy Suffern Tailer (9,a), Bud Ward (10,11,a)

Johnny Fischer (3,a), Johnny Goodman (2,3,5,a), Fred Haas (a) and Reynolds Smith (a) did not play. Tailer was a reserve for the team.

9. Top 30 players and ties from the 1939 Masters Tournament
Ed Dudley (10), Vic Ghezzi (10), Chick Harbert (a), Jimmy Hines (10), Ben Hogan, Ky Laffoon (10), Jug McSpaden (10), Frank Moore, Toney Penna, Felix Serafin (10), Sam Snead (10), Jimmy Thomson, Willie Turnesa (a), Frank Walsh, Al Watrous, Craig Wood (10)

Denny Shute (4,6,10) and Jess Sweetser (3,5,a) did not play.

10. Top 30 players and ties from the 1939 U.S. Open
Johnny Bulla, Sammy Byrd, Harry Cooper, Bobby Cruickshank, Jimmy Demaret, Jim Foulis, Dutch Harrison (12), Clayton Heafner, Dick Metz (12), Ed Oliver, Wilford Wehrle (a)

Olin Dutra (2,6), Matt Kowal and John Rogers did not play.

11. 1939 U.S. Amateur quarter-finalists
George Dawson (a), Art Doering (a)

Harry Givan (a), Ed Kingsley (a) and Don Schumacher (a) did not play.

12. 1939 PGA Championship quarter-finalists
Rod Munday

Emerick Kocsis did not play.

13. One amateur, not already qualified, selected by a ballot of ex-U.S. Amateur champions
Bill Holt (a)

14. One professional, not already qualified, selected by a ballot of ex-U.S. Open champions
Macdonald Smith did not play.

15. Two players, not already qualified, with the best scoring average in the winter part of the 1940 PGA Tour
Willie Goggin, Lloyd Mangrum

16 Foreign invitations
Enrique Bertolino, Jim Ferrier (a), Jules Huot, Martin Pose, Robert Sweeny Jr. (a)

Round summaries

First round
Thursday April 4, 1940  

Source:

Scorecard
First round, set course record   32-32=64 (−8), lasted until 1986

Source:

Second round
Friday April 5, 1940

Source:

Third round
Saturday April 6, 1940

Source:

Final round
Sunday April 7, 1940

Final leaderboard

Sources:

References

External links
Masters.com – past winners and results
Augusta.com – 1940 Masters leaderboard and scorecards

1940
1940 in golf
1940 in American sports
1940 in sports in Georgia (U.S. state)
April 1940 sports events